Savoy Cinema is on Derby Road in Nottingham, England. It is the only surviving pre-Second World War cinema in Nottingham.

History

Savoy Cinema was built in 1935 to designs by the architect Reginald Cooper. It is built in the art-deco style with a curved front. It is owned by Savoy Cinemas.

It was opened on 7 November 1935 by Lenton Picture House Ltd, a consortium of local businessmen. It had seating for 1,242. The first film was Flirtation Walk with Dick Powell.

The interior of the Savoy Cinema was itself used as a setting for part of the famous 1960 film by Alan Sillitoe, Saturday Night and Sunday Morning.

In 1972 the single auditorium was rebuilt to offer three screens.

References

Cinemas in Nottinghamshire
Buildings and structures completed in 1935
Buildings and structures in Nottingham
Art Deco architecture in England